Chariton Arnold Ferrin Jr. (July 29, 1925 − December 27, 2022) was an American professional basketball player, executive, and college athletics administrator.  He played college basketball for the Utah Utes and earned All-American honors four times. He won an NCAA championship in 1944, when he was named the NCAA tournament Most Outstanding Player (MOP). They added a National Invitation Tournament (NIT) title in 1947. Ferrin played professionally with the Minneapolis Lakers in the Basketball Association of America (BAA) and National Basketball Association (NBA). They won league titles in 1949 and 1950.

After his playing career, Ferrin was general manager of the Utah Stars of the American Basketball Association (ABA) from 1972 through 1974. He served as the athletic director at his alma mater, the University of Utah, from 1976 to 1985.

Early life 
Ferrin was born in Salt Lake City. His mother died when he was three years old. Afterwards, his father, Arn, became busy with work; he owned a service station and a small oil delivery company. As his time away from home for work grew, Arn decided to have his parents assume parental responsibilities for his son. When Ferrin was eleven, his father began dating, and eventually remarried. However, Arn had his son continue to live with his grandparents.

College career 
At the University of Utah, Ferrin won the NCAA tournament MOP award in 1944, when the Utes won the NCAA championship over Dartmouth with a 42–40 overtime win. He scored 22 points in the game and was the first freshman to win the award. In 1945, Ferrin averaged 17.5 points per game was named a consensus first-team All-American. Following the end of the regular season, he and teammate Fred Sheffield were drafted into the armed forces, and were unavailable for the NCAA tournament. After a year in the Army, Ferrin returned to help Utah win the 1947 NIT and was a runner-up for the tournament's most valuable player award. At the time, the NIT was as prestigious as the fledgling NCAA tournament, if not more so.

As a senior, Ferrin averaged 14.1 points per game, and became the only four-time All-American at Utah, including consensus second-team honors in 1944, 1947, and 1948. His  22 was retired by the school.

Professional playing career 
Ferrin played professionally for three years with the Minneapolis Lakers from 1949 through 1951 under coach John Kundla. They won the BAA (later known as the NBA) championship in 1949 and won the NBA championship in 1950. He was a top-five scorer on both championship teams, averaging 7.3 points per game in 1948–49 and 5.4 in 1949–50. Ferrin established his single-game career high of 22 points in his rookie year on February 19, 1949, in a win over the Providence Steamrollers. He ended his career with 1,037 total points and an average of 5.8 points per game for the Lakers.

Ferrin was inducted into the National Collegiate Basketball Hall of Fame in 2008 and the Pac-12 Conference Hall of Honor in 2012.

Later years 
After his playing career, Ferrin was a member of the Athletic Council at the University of Utah and was a radio color commentator for the school's basketball and football programs. He was the general manager of the ABA's Utah Stars from 1972 to 1974. He was athletic director at the University of Utah from 1976 to 1985. Under Ferrin, Utah won 10 national championships and 15 conference championships. The Utes' gymnastics program won four national championships under coach Greg Marsden and their men's basketball team, led by coach Jerry Pimm, advanced four times to the Sweet Sixteen of the NCAA tournament.

Ferrin died of natural causes on December 27, 2022, at age 97.

BAA/NBA career statistics 

Source:

Regular season

Playoffs

References

External links 

1925 births
2022 deaths
All-American college men's basketball players
Amateur Athletic Union men's basketball players
American Latter Day Saints
American men's basketball players
Basketball players from Salt Lake City
Minneapolis Lakers draft picks
Minneapolis Lakers players
National Collegiate Basketball Hall of Fame inductees
Shooting guards
Small forwards
Sportspeople from Ogden, Utah
Utah Stars executives
Utah Utes athletic directors
Utah Utes men's basketball players